Yugo-Vostochnaya is a station on the Nekrasovskaya line of the Moscow Metro. The station was opened on 27 March 2020.

Name
During the planning stages, the name of the station was projected to be Ferganskaya Ulitsa for the street where the station is situated. In 2014, the station was renamed Yugo-Vostochnaya by the city. Yugo-Vostochnaya, which means “South-Eastern” in Russian, signifies the location in the southeastern part of the city.

References

Moscow Metro stations
Railway stations in Russia opened in 2020
Nekrasovskaya line